Digama daressalamica is a moth of the  family Erebidae. It is found in Africa.

External links
 Species info

Aganainae
Insects of Tanzania
Moths of Africa
Moths described in 1911